Filippos Kaiafas (Greek: Φίλιππος Καϊάφας; born 21 August 1968, Nea Ionia, Magnesia) is a Greek former water polo player who competed in the 1988 Summer Olympics, in the 1992 Summer Olympics, in the 1996 Summer Olympics, and in the 2000 Summer Olympics. He won two Greek championships with Ethnikos.

Honours
 Greek Championship: 1988, 1994
 Greek Cup: 1988, 1991, 1998

See also
 Greece men's Olympic water polo team records and statistics
 List of players who have appeared in multiple men's Olympic water polo tournaments

References

External links
 

1968 births
Living people
Greek male water polo players
Olympic water polo players of Greece
Water polo players at the 1988 Summer Olympics
Water polo players at the 1992 Summer Olympics
Water polo players at the 1996 Summer Olympics
Water polo players at the 2000 Summer Olympics

Ethnikos Piraeus Water Polo Club players
Olympiacos Water Polo Club players
People from Magnesia (regional unit)